Mämmetweli Kemine (c. 1770 – c. 1840) was a Turkmen satirical poet whose works have become a key part of Turkmen literature.
Born in Sarahs, he studied at the Islamic medrassah in Bukhara.

Some forty of his poems survive. Many are critical of the clergy and landowners.

References 

1770 births
1840 deaths
Humorous poets
Ethnic Turkmen poets
People from Ahal Region